The 1983 Star World Championships were held in Marina del Rey, United States August 9–21, 1983. The hosting yacht club was California Yacht Club.

Results

References
 
 

Star World Championships
1983 in sailing
Star World Championships in the United States